Basil Gerald "Stapme" Stapleton,  (12 May 1920 – 13 April 2010) was a Royal Air Force (RAF) officer and fighter ace who flew Spitfires and Typhoons during the Second World War. He preferred the name Gerald and was nicknamed "Stapme" after a phrase used in his favourite cartoon strip Just Jake published in The Daily Mirror. His score of 6 enemy aircraft destroyed, 2 shared destroyed, 8 probably destroyed and 2 damaged, all achieved on Spitfires during the Battle of Britain made him one of the outstanding pilots of that battle and he was revered as one of Richard Hillary's contemporaries in whose book The Last Enemy, he features. Without doubt he was one of the real 'characters' to survive the war and to many the quintessential image of a Battle of Britain fighter pilot, complete with handlebar moustache.

Early life

Born on 12 May 1920 in Durban, Natal, Union of South Africa, Stapleton was educated in England, at King Edward VI School at Totnes, Devon.

Military career

In January 1939 he signed up for a short service commission with the RAF, and following pilot training, and after a short period flying Blenheim night fighters, he was transferred to No. 603 (City of Edinburgh) Squadron at RAF Montrose, Scotland, in October 1939.

In the early months of the war, Scotland endured many German bomber raids mainly targeting the shipyards of the Clyde. On 16 October 1939, Stapleton's squadron intercepted the first German air raid on the British Isles, during which the first enemy aircraft of the Second World War were shot down. During this raid Stapleton shared two German bombers shot down in the estuary of the Firth of Forth.

Battle of Britain

For the first period of the Battle of Britain, 603 Squadron remained in Scotland. On 27 August 1940, 603 were sent south to join 11 Group based at RAF Hornchurch in Essex. This was during the critical phase of the battle, when the fighter airfields were being attacked. Pilot attrition was high, as 603 found out the next day.

Stapleton recalled:

In an attempt to avoid the situation happening again, the CO, Squadron Leader 'Uncle' George Denholm, employed a system of climbing on a reciprocal heading to that given by the controllers after take-off. Only when he believed they had gained sufficient altitude did they turn onto the heading given by the controllers towards the enemy. But still the losses mounted up.

No. 603 Squadron lost 13 pilots during the summer of 1940 with many more seriously injured, most of whom were good friends of Stapleton. These included on 3 September Richard Hillary, who was shot down and badly burned, and wrote his book during recovery, and on 5 September one of the flight commanders, Flight Lieutenant Fred 'Rusty' Rushmer, who was killed. But it was not all bad news as Stapleton, 603 and the RAF were scoring kills and inflicting heavy losses on the Luftwaffe.

A short time after the war Stapleton learned that the pilot was Oberleutnant Franz von Werra, whose exploits were made famous in the book and film The One That Got Away, the only German pilot PoW to escape captivity (from Canada) during World War II and return to Germany. On 7 September the Luftwaffe changed tactics and began bombing British cities. On that day, Stapleton was shot down himself:

Gerald was awarded the Distinguished Flying Cross on 15 November 1940, and in December the unit returned to Scotland.

Other duties

Stapleton left 603 Squadron in April 1941 and served in various units, including flying 'Hurricats' (Hurricane fighters converted as catapult-launched convoy escorts) with the Merchant Ship Fighter Unit, as a flight commander with 257 Squadron, and as an instructor at Central Gunnery School before taking over Command of No. 247 (China-British) Squadron, part of 124 Wing, 2nd Tactical Air Force, flying Typhoons from beachhead code B.6, northern France in August 1944. Initially the squadron helped close the Falaise Gap but as the Allied forces moved inland, so they followed: from B.6 – Coulombs to B.68 (Amiens/Glisy), B.58 (Melsbroek) and B.78 (Eindhoven).

Operation Market Garden

No. 247 Squadron provided aerial support throughout the Arnhem campaign during Operation Market Garden.

In January 1946 he received notification he had been awarded the Dutch DFC for his leadership of 247 Squadron throughout Operation Market Garden, conferred by Queen Wilhelmina of the Netherlands. There was no ceremony; he received the medal in the post.

Prisoner of war

On 23 December 1944 Stapleton was forced to land behind enemy lines and became a prisoner of war.

Post-war

He left the RAF in April 1946 and went to work for British Overseas Airways Corporation (BOAC) flying Doves, Herons and Dakotas on the West African routes until 1948 when he returned to the United Kingdom. Later Stapleton emigrated to South Africa, where he had a number of very different jobs, including in Botswana, a country he refers to as 'God's Own'. In 1994, he returned to the UK with his wife, Audrey.

To commemorate the 50th Anniversary of the formation of the Battle of Britain Memorial Flight in 2007, for the next two seasons the Flight's Supermarine Spitfire IIa, P7350, which fought in 603 Squadron during the Battle of Britain will carry the letters XT-L, Stapleton's personal aircraft.

Biography

In 2002 an authorised biography was published (co-written by David Ross) in which Stapleton recounted his war time experiences. They both also attended many commemorative functions. Ross also wrote a biography of Richard Hillary.

See also

List of World War II aces from South Africa
Non-British personnel in the RAF during the Battle of Britain

References

External links
Battle of Britain Memorial Flight – foreword written by Stapleton with some biography and photos.

1920 births
2010 deaths
Stapleton, Gerald 'Stapme'
Recipients of the Distinguished Flying Cross (United Kingdom)
Recipients of the Airman's Cross
Royal Air Force officers
South African World War II flying aces
Shot-down aviators
Royal Air Force pilots of World War II
World War II prisoners of war held by Germany
The Few
British World War II prisoners of war
British expatriates in South Africa